Elena Pavlovna Eliseenko (born 5 May 1959) is a Russian former professional tennis player. She was a singles and doubles gold medalist at the Friendship Games, an event held for countries boycotting the 1984 Olympics.

Eliseenko represented the Soviet Union in a total of 14 Federation Cup ties, between 1978 and 1985. She featured in three quarter-finals, including a tie against Great Britain in 1981 where she took Sue Barker to three sets. During her Federation Cup career she won two of her six singles rubbers and lost only once in eight doubles rubbers.

While competing on the professional tour she appeared in the main draws of both the French Open and Wimbledon. Her best performance was a run to the third round at the 1984 French Open, as a qualifier.

WTA Tour finals

Doubles (0-1)

See also
List of Soviet Federation Cup team representatives

References

External links
 
 
 

1959 births
Living people
Soviet female tennis players
Friendship Games medalists in tennis